Throston is an area of north Hartlepool within the borough of Hartlepool in County Durham, England. The area name is from the Anglo Saxon thosson meaning hill.

It was formerly a rural district with Throston near the Headland overlooking the Tees bay. The district also covered inland farm areas such as Dyke House and West View; some included Throston in their names such as High Throston and Throston Grange. As Hartlepool developed the district merged with the town and is now mainly urban.

Education
The area has multiple primary schools such as Throston, Brougham, Springwell, Sacred Heart (Roman Catholic), St Bega's (Roman Catholic) and West View. Dyke House Sports and Technology College secondary school and sixth form is also in the area.

Gallery

References

External links

Villages in County Durham
Hartlepool
Places in the Tees Valley